is a Welsh-language television news programme for children and young people, produced by BBC Cymru Wales for S4C.

Overview
Originally broadcast three times a week for 15 minutes (except during school summer holidays),  was later broadcast live for four and a half minutes every weekday afternoon throughout the year at 4:50pm, from the BBC's Broadcasting House in Llandaff, Cardiff. The programme was transmitted from Studio C2, the second largest studio in Broadcasting House. Following a relaunch in Spring 2012,  broadcast as part of S4C's  strand on Mondays to Fridays from a smaller presentation studio at 5:00pm during term-time. It moved to New Broadcasting House, Cardiff in September 2020 into a VR green-screen studio and broadcasts on Mondays to Fridays at 5:55pm.

The programme has often been compared to its English-language counterpart, CBBC's Newsround.  differs in that it is produced directly by the BBC Cymru Wales news and current affairs department, whereas Newsround is produced by CBBC with facilities provided by BBC News. The programme also has an expanded brief to cover Welsh regional news and features, alongside national and international news. The reporters and presenters on  also regularly contribute to news coverage on BBC Radio Cymru and the nightly  programme on S4C.

Presenters and reporters
Mared Ifan
Ifan Gwyn Davies
Aimee Thomas

Past presenters
Alex Humphreys (Presenter/reporter)
Mari Grug (Presenter/reporter)
Guto Owen (Presenter/reporter)
Teleri Glyn Jones (Presenter/reporter)
Hanna Hopwood (Presenter/reporter)
Huw Foulkes (Presenter/reporter)
Owain Wyn Evans (Presenter/reporter)
Catrin Heledd (Presenter/reporter)
Jason Phelps (Presenter/reporter)
Iwan Griffiths (Presenter/reporter)
Steffan Messenger (Presenter/reporter)
Karen Peacock (North Wales Correspondent)
Mererid Wigley (Presenter/reporter)
Ben Thomas (Presenter/reporter)
Nest Roberts (North Wales Correspondent)
Gruff Rowlands (Presenter/reporter)
Rachel Evans (Presenter/reporter)

S4C original programming
BBC children's television shows
BBC television news shows
1995 British television series debuts
British television news shows
Children's news shows